Police Counter Attack Team or simply CAT is one of the special forces unit of the General Directorate of Security. Unlike the Police Special Operations Department (PÖH), the unit specializes in executive protection.

Role 
These teams, established in the 1970s, reinforce the other special forces in the event of a major terrorist incident.

The nature of the team was similar to the SWAT teams of North America, but with greater emphasis on counter-terrorism (CT) training and capability, reportedly to include operations involving hijacked aircraft.

Now, the team changes its role to a close protection unit, which is currently assigned to the protection to the Turkish Prime Minister and President.

US Counterpart was USSS.

Handguns
 SIG Sauer P226

Submachine guns
 FN P90
 IMI Micro Uzi
 HK MP5

Rifles
 SIG 556
 Heckler & Koch HK416
 M4A1
 MKEK MPT-76
 SIG Sauer SIG516

References

National law enforcement agencies of Turkey
Special forces of Turkey
Protective security units